Hydrogenophaga taeniospiralis is a catalase-negative bacterium from the Comamonadaceae family.

References

External links
Type strain of Hydrogenophaga taeniospiralis at BacDive -  the Bacterial Diversity Metadatabase

Comamonadaceae
Bacteria described in 1989